Ban Kat may refer to:

Ban Kat, Mae Sariang, tambon (subdistrict) of Mae Sariang District, Mae Hong Son Province, Thailand
Ban Kat, Mae Wang,  tambon of Mae Wang District, Chiang Mai Province, Thailand
Ban Kat, tambon of Sung Men District, Phrae Province, Thailand